Gambar is a name and may refer to:

Abboud Gambar or Abboud Qambar, Iraqi General
Gambar Zulalov (1895-1976), Azerbaijani khananda, actor and honored artist 
Isa Gambar (born 1957), Azerbaijani politician 
Sammy Gambar or Abdulraof Macacua, Filipino politician and minister
Usta Gambar Karabakhi (1830s–1905), Azerbaijani ornamentalist painter

See also
1957 Gambar train crash